Shante Carver (born February 12, 1971) is a former American football defensive end in the National Football League (NFL) for the Dallas Cowboys. He also was a member of the Memphis Maniax and Dallas Desperados. He played college football at Arizona State University.

Early years
Carver attended Lincoln High School, where he played football (defensive end / tight end) and basketball (center), receiving All-state honors as a senior in both sports.

As a senior, he tallied 33 tackles, 5 sacks and 20 receptions for 452 yards. In basketball, he posted 21 and 24 rebounds in consecutive games. The Stockton Record named him its Male Athlete of the year and he also received the California Grid-Hoops player of the year award.

College career
Carver accepted a football scholarship from Arizona State University. As a redshirt freshman, he was named a starter at defensive end and became one of the best pass rushers in the nation. He registered 48 tackles (11 for loss), 10 sacks (school record for freshman), 14 quarterback pressures and 4 passes defensed.

As a sophomore, he was dismissed from the school, for academic reasons, and he lost his mother to a terrible car crash as well as his grandmother (natural causes) all in a couple of months. Carver overcame all the setbacks and personal loss and was later admitted back into Arizona State University as a student athlete. He collected 39 tackles (16 for loss), 11 sacks, 20 quarterback pressures and 6 passes defensed.

As a junior, he tallied 59 tackles (13 for loss), 10 sacks, 27 quarterback pressures, 2 passes defensed, 2 forced fumbles and one fumble recovery.

Carver had a dominant senior season in which the defensive unit was nicknamed "Shante's Inferno". He led the team in tackles (79), tackles for loss (17), sacks (10.0) and quarterback pressures (25). He also had 4 passes defensed and 3 fumble recoveries.

He was a four-year starter, that recorded double-figure sacks in each of his collegiate seasons, had 20-or-more quarterback pressures and was named the team defensive MVP, in all but his freshman year. He was a two-time All-American and All-Pac-10 and a finalist for the Outland Trophy. His athletic ability also allowed him to walk-on to the basketball team during the 1992–93 season, playing in 9 contests, while averaging 0.4 points and 0.8 rebounds per game.

Carver finished his college career with 225 tackles, 41 sacks (school record), 86 quarterback pressures (school record), 57 tackles for loss, 16 passes defensed, 2 forced fumbles, 4 fumble recoveries and 5 blocked kicks. Most of his school records were broken by Terrell Suggs in 2002.

In 2012, he was inducted into the Arizona State University Sports Hall of Fame.

Professional career

Dallas Cowboys
Looking for a successor to replace Charles Haley and Tony Tolbert in the 1994 NFL Draft, the Dallas Cowboys tried to trade up to acquire Willie McGinest. After being unable to make the transaction, they traded their first (#28-William Floyd) and second-round (#62-Tyronne Drakeford) selections to the San Francisco 49ers, in exchange for a first (#23) and a seventh round (#217-Rob Holmberg) draft choice, in order to move up and take Carver in the first round.

As a rookie, he played in 10 games because of injuries, finishing with 5 tackles (one for loss). He also made news after suffering an automobile accident, abandoning his truck and reporting it as stolen.

In 1995, he did not have a good regular season, making 21 tackles (one for loss), 2.5 sacks, 3 quarterback pressures and one pass defensed. While Haley was injured, he started the season finale and 2 playoff games. He also contributed as a backup in Super Bowl XXX, with a then career-high 5 tackles.

In 1996, the Cowboys drafted Kavika Pittman to have a replacement ready in case his lack of production continued. Carver was suspended six games for repeated violations of the league's anti-drug policy. He started the final 7 games of the regular season and both playoff contests in place of an injured Haley, while registering 33 tackles (one for loss), 3 sacks, 8 quarterback pressures, one pass defensed and one forced fumble.

In 1997, he finished with 47 tackles (ninth on the team) 6 sacks (led the team), 9 quarterback pressures (second on the team), 3 tackles for loss and 3 passes defensed. The Cowboys did not re-sign him at the end of the season, finishing his career with 26 starts in four seasons, 11.5 sacks and 2 forced fumbles.

B.C. Lions (CFL)
On May 26, 2000, he signed with the B.C. Lions of the Canadian Football League. He was released on June 29.

Memphis Maniax (XFL)
In 2001, he was selected by the Memphis Maniax in the 23rd round (179th overall) of the XFL Draft, for the league's lone season. After recording 32 tackles 4 sacks and 1 interception, he was recognized as one of the best defensive players and was named to the All-XFL team. He also is remembered for delivering a particularly spectacular sack on Orlando Rage quarterback Jeff Brohm.

Dallas Desperados (AFL)
On November 26, 2001, Carver signed with the Dallas Desperados who were owned by Jerry Jones (who also owned the Dallas Cowboys), after the XFL folded. He earned AFL All-Rookie honors after registering 16 tackles, 2.5 sacks and 2 interceptions. He played for the team three years, retiring at the end of the 2004 season.

Personal life
Carver was a football assistant coach at Scottsdale Community College from 2005 to 2007. In 2009, he was named he head coach for the semi pro football team Westside Monsoon in the Arizona Football League. In 2011, he coached the defensive line at Moon Valley High School.

References

External links
 Memphis Maniax profile

1971 births
Living people
American football defensive ends
American men's basketball players
Arizona State Sun Devils football players
Arizona State Sun Devils men's basketball players
Dallas Cowboys players
Dallas Desperados players
Memphis Maniax players
Scottsdale Fighting Artichokes football coaches
High school football coaches in Arizona
All-American college football players
Players of Canadian football from Stockton, California
Players of American football from Stockton, California
Centers (basketball)
Basketball players from Stockton, California